Brooking Springs Station is a pastoral lease that operates as a cattle station in Western Australia.

Location
Mount Hardman and numerous creeks are also within the station boundaries.

History
The traditional owners of the area are the Bunuba people, who have worked on the property as stockmen since the property was established.

In 1954 the property occupied an area of  when it was placed on the market. At this time it was stocked with 8,000 head of cattle and 160 horses, and was subdivided into five paddocks. 

In 2001 the leaseholder was Peter Camm, who was blocked from buying Moola Bulla and Mount Amhurst Stations by the planning minister Alannah MacTiernan. The block resulted from cattle stealing charges that had been brought against Camm three years earlier.

The family of Jill Jenyns placed the property on the market following her death in a helicopter crash in 2011. The property was expected to fetch 15 million and was stocked with approximately 15,000 head of cattle. It sold later the same year for 18 million to the Bunuba Cattle Company, an Indigenous group, with the Australian Agricultural Company expected to manage the operations.

As of 2014 the  property was still on the market along with at least 15 others in the Kimberley and Northern Territory.

See also
List of ranches and stations

References

Stations (Australian agriculture)
Pastoral leases in Western Australia
Kimberley (Western Australia)